Kaikhosro I Gurieli (died 1660), of the House of Gurieli, was Prince of Guria from 1626 to 1658. He was installed by Levan II Dadiani, Prince of Mingrelia, in place of his deposed predecessor Simon I Gurieli. In his turn, Kaikhosro was overthrown and expelled by King Alexander III of Imereti. His comeback to Guria, in an Ottoman-supported endeavor, concluded with his assassination by a Gurian nobleman.

Career 
Kaikhosro Gurieli was the son of Vakhtang I Gurieli. He was installed, in 1626, by Levan II Dadiani, Prince of Mingrelia, who had defeated, dethroned, and blinded his brother-in-law Simon I Gurieli. In 1658, Kaikhosro supported his uterine half-brother Liparit III Dadiani against Alexander III, King of Imereti. At the battle of Bandza in June 1658, Alexander won a decisive victory and established loyal regimes in Guria and Mingrelia. Kaikhosro was forced in exile to Istanbul. He then secured support of the Ottoman pasha of Akhaltsikhe Rustam, a Muslim Georgian, and capitalized on the anarchy in Imereti following King Alexander's death to attack his rival prince Demetre Gurieli in 1660. Vameq III Dadiani intervened with a force of Mingrelians, Imeretians, and Abkhazians to protect Demetre. Kaikhosro took shelter at the Achi Monastery and counterattacked, succeeding in taking Ozurgeti, Guria's chief town. Kaikhosro's triumph was short-lived; he was treacherously murdered by the Gurian nobleman Machutadze and Guria reverted to Demetre Gurieli. Kaikhosro's sons Giorgi and Malakia fled to Akhaltsikhe.

Family 
Kaikhosro was married to Khvaramze Goshadze. He had two sons and two daughters: 

 Prince Giorgi III Gurieli (died 1684), Prince-regnant of Guria (1669–1684), King of Imereti (1681–1683);
 Prince Malakia Gurieli (died after 1689), bishop of Shemokmedi and Jumati, Prince-regnant of Guria (1684–1685, 1689);
 Princess Tuta (died 1678), who married Levan of Kartli in 1672;
 Princess Darjean, who married Prince Giorgi Tavdgiridze.

References 

1660 deaths
House of Gurieli
17th-century people from Georgia (country)